Chiosella is an extinct conodont genus.

The base of the Anisian stage (also the base of the Middle Triassic series and the top of the Olenekian) is sometimes laid at the first appearance of Chiosella timorensis in the stratigraphic record.

References

External links 

 
 

Conodont genera
Middle Triassic fish
Triassic conodonts
Anisian life